"Don't Wanna Know" is a song by American pop rock band Maroon 5. It features additional vocals from American rapper Kendrick Lamar. The song was released on October 12, 2016, as the lead single from their sixth studio album Red Pill Blues (2017), included on both the deluxe and Japanese editions of the album. The song reached the top 10 in 23 countries, including number 6 in the United States. Critical reception to the song was mixed, with critics praising its production but criticizing Lamar's verse and repetitive chorus.

Background and release
On October 11, 2016, Maroon 5 announced a single "Don't Wanna Know" featuring Kendrick Lamar, will be released worldwide at midnight on the following day, October 12. Lamar was known in the 2013 song "YOLO" by The Lonely Island featuring the band's lead singer Adam Levine, which Lamar previously collaborated with Levine.

Composition
"Don't Wanna Know" is written in the key of G major in common time with a shuffling tempo of 100 beats per minute. The song follows a chord progression of CMaj7DEmBm/E, and Levine's vocals span from D4 to C6.

Critical reception
The song received mixed reviews by music critics. Mike Wass of Idolator stated "there's nothing bloated or excessive about the finished product. In fact, this is a case of less is more. [Don't Wanna Know] freshens up Maroon 5's sound and goes HAM on the repetition (the cornerstone of hitmarking circa 2016) — all but guarantees the band a smash hit in the process. Kendrick's verse feels like an afterthought, but apart from that, this is hard to fault." Vultures Halle Kiefer said "it'll be on the soundtrack to every car commercial, Target ad, and drunken breakup you flounder through for the next three months" and went on to say "Don't Wanna Know has a distinctly non-Maroon 5 sound, putting a breezy, bouncy, lighthearted spin on drinking to forget, and dancing to dull the pain of losing the one true connection you ever had."

Commercial performance
"Don't Wanna Know" was number one on the US iTunes chart after its release. Since its release, the song debuted at number 56 on the Billboard Hot 100 on October 29, 2016, and jumped to number 9 in its second week on November 5. It later peaked at number 6, becoming the band's 12th and Lamar's third top 10.

Music video
The music video for "Don't Wanna Know" was directed by David Dobkin and does not include Lamar, instead using the song's original version. It was shot in August 2016, in Los Angeles, and premiered on The Today Show, on October 14, 2016. The video spoofed the augmented reality game Pokémon Go.

In the video, Adam Levine is dressed as a blue turtle dealing with heartbreak over an orange played by Sarah Silverman, with the Maroon 5 members also dressed the various costumes. In certain scenes, they're being chased and hiding from people who play the game to capture a creature onto the phone and other times eliminate themselves, as well as the set of shooting a music video in the studio complete with film crew, the band performing in a concert and the house party. The video also features cameos from Ed Helms, Amanda Cerny, Shaquille O'Neal and Vince Vaughn.

Promotion
Upon the song being released; the song was revealed to be in the dance rhythm video game Just Dance 2017. In November 2016, Maroon 5 collaborated with Tumblr to launch a promotional campaign known as the Don't Wanna Know Confessional Wall, where encouraging fans to submit of their own darkest secrets, allowing them to write the wall in the most creative way possible. The wall is located at La Brea Avenue in Los Angeles. It is also nominated at the 2017 Shorty Awards for Best Use of Tumblr. In December 2016, another campaign from Musical.ly, where fans to sing a lip sync video and chance to win a signed guitar.

Live performances
On September 3, 2016, Maroon 5 debuted "Don't Wanna Know", to perform for the first time on their world tour at San Antonio. The band played the song during their live performances including The Ellen DeGeneres Show on November 3, and The Voice on November 28, 2016. Maroon 5 also performed along with Kendrick Lamar for closing ceremony at the 2016 American Music Awards on November 20, 2016. The band continuing the song live with the 2017 edition of Wango Tango on May 13.

Accolades

Track listing

Digital download – Original
"Don't Wanna Know" – 3:34

Digital download – Single
"Don't Wanna Know" (featuring Kendrick Lamar) – 3:34

Digital download – Extended
"Don't Wanna Know" (featuring Kendrick Lamar) – 4:25

Digital download – Ryan Riback Remix 
"Don't Wanna Know" (Ryan Riback Remix) (featuring Kendrick Lamar) – 3:50

Digital download – BRAVVO Remix
"Don't Wanna Know" (BRAVVO Remix) (featuring Kendrick Lamar) – 3:24

Digital download – Fareoh Remix
"Don't Wanna Know" (Fareoh Remix) (featuring Kendrick Lamar) – 3:57

Digital download – Total Ape Remix
"Don't Wanna Know" (Total Ape Remix) (featuring Kendrick Lamar) – 3:14

Digital download – Zaeden Remix
"Don't Wanna Know" (Zaeden Remix) (featuring Kendrick Lamar) – 3:34

Personnel

Maroon 5
 Adam Levine – lead and backing vocals, songwriting
 Jesse Carmichael – keyboards, rhythm guitar, backing vocals
 Mickey Madden – bass
 James Valentine – lead guitar, backing vocals
 Matt Flynn – electronic drums, percussion
 PJ Morton – keyboards, synthesizer, backing vocals

Additional personnel
 Kendrick Lamar – rap (featured artist)

Charts

Weekly charts

Year-end charts

Certifications

Release history

References

2016 singles
2016 songs
Maroon 5 songs
Songs about loneliness
Songs written by Kurtis Mckenzie
Songs written by Kendrick Lamar
Songs written by Adam Levine
Songs written by Jacob Kasher
Songs written by Ammar Malik
Songs written by John Ryan (musician)
Kendrick Lamar songs
222 Records singles
Interscope Records singles
Music videos directed by David Dobkin